Andres Martin (born July 7, 2001) is an American tennis player.

Personal life
His mother Andrea and father Rafael moved to Flowery Branch, Georgia in 2001 having previously lived in Atlanta, Georgia. He has a younger sister named Eva. He turned down offers from Stanford, Dartmouth and the University of Columbia, amongst others, to become a student at Georgia Tech where he is an engineering major.

Career
He made his ATP tour debut as a wildcard at the 2021 Atlanta Open, playing doubles alongside Keshav Chopra.

He made his ATP Tour singles debut at the 2022 Atlanta Open as a wildcard and in the first round defeated Thanasi Kokkinakis for his first ATP win.

References

External links
 
 
 

2001 births
Living people
Tennis people from Georgia (U.S. state)
Tennis players from Atlanta
American male tennis players
Georgia Tech Yellow Jackets men's tennis players